Seydina Bahnou Diarra (born 1 April 1994 in Brussels) is a Belgian-Malian professional football player who plays as a midfielder for Napoli United in Italy.

Career
He made his professional debut on 3 August 2013 against FC Groningen. He joined N.E.C. in July 2013 from Anderlecht.

Napoli United.

Honours

Club
NEC
Eerste Divisie (1): 2014–15

References

External links
 Voetbal International profile 
 

1994 births
Living people
Belgian footballers
Belgian expatriate footballers
Senegalese footballers
R.S.C. Anderlecht players
NEC Nijmegen players
S.C. Eendracht Aalst players
FC Vereya players
Eredivisie players
Eerste Divisie players
First Professional Football League (Bulgaria) players
Footballers from Brussels
Association football midfielders
Belgian expatriate sportspeople in the Netherlands
Belgian expatriate sportspeople in Bulgaria
Belgian expatriate sportspeople in Italy
Expatriate footballers in the Netherlands
Expatriate footballers in Bulgaria
Expatriate footballers in Italy